OESB-FS is the correspondence chess subdivision of the Austrian Chess Federation. It was founded in 1947 and is part of the ICCF national member federation.

Correspondence chess developed relatively late in Austria, in the second half of the 19th century.

History 

It was not until 1865, when the Wiener Schachgesellschaft (Viennese Chess Society, founded in 1857) played a set of matches against several prominent clubs from other cities, including 1865-1866 Vienna-Insterburg 2-0, 1867-1869 Vienna- Berlin 2-0, 1872-1874 Vienna-London 0.5-1.5.

With the establishment of the Wiener Schachzeitung (Viennese Chess Bulletin) in 1898 and the beginning of Vienna's "golden era" of chess, playing chess boomed. At the same time under the protectorate of Georg Marco, the  organised correspondence tournaments, which attracted some of the best known masters of the day : Adolf Zinkl, Carl Schlechter, Siegfried Reginald Wolf, Heinrich Wolf and even the very young Ernst Grünfeld.

In Graz Johann Berger was the first Austrian to win an important international correspondence tournament  — the  1889-1892  — and he did so with a result of +45 =3 -0.

World War I brought a sudden end to this development, and it was only in the mid-twenties that Austrian correspondence chess came close to the height of pre-war interest. The Pan-European Tournaments of the new  under the direction of Albert Becker played an important role.

New impulses came to correspondence chess in 1928 with the establishment of the Internationaler Fernschachbund (IFSB) and the magazine  (correspondence chess), where the Austrian Franz Kunert proved to be an excellent supervisor and designing mind of the new organisation.

Over the board (OTB) International Master Hans Müller won the IFSB tournament of 1932-1933  (an unofficial correspondence chess world championship) in front of Dr. Eduard Dyckhoff and the later Austrian OTB Grandmaster Erich Eliskases.

Friendly matches with other countries began in 1930 and they were conducted regularly after 1950. In the first CC-Olympiad of European countries (an idea from Franz Kunert) 1937-1939, the Austrian team with Ernst Grünfeld, Erich Eliskases, Hans Müller, Albert Becker, Karl Poschauko and Hans Haberditz finished the finals in second place : Hungary (20.5) was first, followed by Austria (19.5) Switzerland (16) and then Portugal, Denmark and Germany.

After World War II, in 1947, Hans Schmid founded the section for correspondence chess within the Austrian Chess Federation. In the same year, Austria joined the ICCF. In 1952 the well-known correspondence chess-master Egon Spitzenberger took over the correspondence section and was its indefatigable organiser and promoter of correspondence chess until his death. The best known player of his generation was International Master Leopold Watzl who finished sixth in the finals of the world championship 1950–1953  after winning his preliminary section.

International events with the national team 

In team events Austria has not fared so well. Two notable exceptions were the final of the first European Team Championships 1973–1983  in which Austria claimed third place Behind the USSR and FRG with Giselbrecht, Spitzenberger and Danner playing on board 1-3 ; and in the fourth European Team Championships (1993–1999)  when Austria finished 4th behind Germany, Italy and Switzerland.

Grandmaster

 Tunç Hamarat    
 Hermann Knoll  
 Christian Muck  
 Friedrich Rattinger  
 Harald Tarnowiecki 
 Sven Teichmeister  
 Wolfgang Zugrav

Senior International Master
 Andreas Burger
 Fritz Fleischanderl
 Helmut Grabner
 László M. Kovács
 Rüdiger Löschnauer
 Siegfried Neuschmied
 Maximilian Pichler
 Franz Thannhausser
 Hans Eduard Ude
 Peter Valent
 Werner Wakolbinger
 Günter Waldhauser
 Kurt Wallner

International Master

 Max Aigmüller
 Ulrich Altrichter
 Georg Danner
 Josef F. Giselbrecht
 Werner Groiss
 Rudolf Hofer
 Kurt Kaliwoda
 Oskar Kallinger
 Klaus Mayr
 Johann Poecksteiner
 Heinz Polsterer
 Johann Rehor
 Franz Rupp
 Wilhelm Rupp
 Friedrich Schaetzel
 Norbert Sommerbauer
 Leopold Watzl
 Herbert Wohlfahrt

Ladies Grandmaster
 Gertrude Schoisswohl

References

External links
 OESB-FS

Austria
Chess in Austria
Correspondence chess
Correspondence chess organizations